N. Subramanian is an Indian politician and incumbent member of the Tamil Nadu from Gandarvakottai constituency. He is currently the Minister for Adi Dravidar and Tribal Welfare in the Government of Tamil Nadu. He represents Anna Dravida Munnetra Kazhagam party.

References 

Members of the Tamil Nadu Legislative Assembly
All India Anna Dravida Munnetra Kazhagam politicians
Living people
State cabinet ministers of Tamil Nadu
Year of birth missing (living people)